Rock Ferry is a suburb of Birkenhead, Wirral, Merseyside, England. It contains 36 buildings that are recorded in the National Heritage List for England as designated listed buildings, all of which are listed at Grade II. This grade is the lowest of the three gradings given to listed buildings and is applied to "buildings of national importance and special interest". The area is residential, and developed originally as a private estate by Jonathan Bennison in 1836–. Most of the listed buildings are large houses and associated structures built in this development. The other listed buildings are a slipway into the River Mersey, a sea wall, a swimming baths and two churches.

References

Citations

Sources

Listed buildings in Merseyside
Lists of listed buildings in Merseyside